Robert Kenneth Mailhouse (born January 22, 1962) is an American actor and musician. He has also appeared in television series including the soap opera Days of Our Lives and the situation comedy Seinfeld. He is the drummer for the grunge-alternative rock band Dogstar and plays in the band becky.

Career
Mailhouse is a graduate of Suffield Academy. In the early 1990s, he appeared on the soap opera Days of Our Lives. He appeared in guest roles in a variety of television series in the 1990s, including Seinfeld, Picket Fences, Melrose Place, Caroline in the City (1997), Dharma & Greg (1999) and Sports Night (1998-2000), in a recurring role as CSC executive JJ. In the 2000s, he appeared in episodes of television series such as Judging Amy (2002) and C.S.I.: Crime Scene Investigation (2003). He has also appeared in several films, including Speed (1994). As a musician, he played drums with the grunge-alternative rock band Dogstar, which has opened for David Bowie and toured with Bon Jovi. The band released an EP entitled Quattro Formagi (1995) and two albums: Our Little Visionary (Zoo/BMG, 1996) and Happy Ending (2000). Dogstar attracted media attention from the off-stage job held by its bassist Keanu Reeves as a Hollywood actor. Mailhouse starred in A Christmas Pageant alongside actress Melissa Gilbert in 2011.

Filmography

References

External links

1962 births
American male film actors
American male television actors
Living people
Male actors from New Haven, Connecticut
20th-century American male actors
21st-century American male actors
20th-century American drummers
American male drummers
20th-century American male musicians
Dogstar (band) members